WWAC (1020 kHz) is a commercial AM radio station licensed to Ocean City, New Jersey, and serving the Atlantic City area of the Jersey Shore.  It is owned by WIBG, LLC, and broadcasts a Spanish-language Contemporary Hits radio format.  WWAC is co-owned with WIBG-FM, an oldies station licensed to Avalon, New Jersey.

By day, WWAC is powered at 1,900 watts, non-directional.  WWAC's signal reaches from Toms River to Cape May.  But 1020 AM is a clear channel frequency reserved for 50,000 watt Class A KDKA Pittsburgh.  So at night, WWAC must go off the air to avoid interference.  During critical hours, WWAC is powered at 680 watts.  

Programming is also heard on several FM translators around the clock:  W267BP 101.3 MHz in Pleasantville, W270DV 101.9 MHz in Palermo and W298DI 107.5 MHz in Port Norris.

History
The original call sign was WSLT and the original frequency was 1520 kHz. The studios were on Asbury Avenue and the original owner was Salt-Tee Radio.

The call letters were changed to WIBG in 1978 after the call sign went out of use in Philadelphia. The station broadcast with various formats over the years including middle of the road (MOR), Top 40, oldies and country music. In the early 1980s, WIBG lost the lease on its transmitter site in Somers Point and went off the air for a time. A replacement site in Cape May County was eventually located.  The station built a new tower site and returned to the air, changing its frequency to 1020 kHz in the process. The revived WIBG aired Spanish-language programming and tourist information before adopting a Christian radio format.

On November 19, 2008, the then-WIBG joined Radiolicious and began streaming on the iPhone and iPod Touch.

In October 2011, the station changed to a talk radio format. In May 2013, WIBG dropped its syndicated talk programs and began programming music on weekdays, with some local talk shows and religious broadcasts continuing to be broadcast on weekends, along with "Wibbage Gold" oldies. On June 3, 2013, the format changed to Spanish hits "En Vivo 1020".

In January 2017, the station changed its moniker to "La Mega 101.3" and the call sign was switched to WWAC on April 7, 2021.  The moniker refers to the dial position of WWAC's primary FM translator.

References

External links
 WWAC official website
 La Mega website

 
 
 
 
 
 

WAC
News and talk radio stations in the United States
WAC
WAC
Radio stations established in 1964
1964 establishments in New Jersey